The National parks and protected areas, and wildlife refuges, of Iransepehr

Listings

There are around 200 protected areas in Iran to preserve the precious biodiversity of this country and there are about 16 National Parks among them that are home to some of our planet’s most incredible species. Golestan National Park, Kavir National Park, Turan National Park, and Tandoureh National Park are among the top protected areas. Each of these parks encompasses exceptional and unique varieties of flora and fauna in their wild frontiers. Notice that all National Parks of Iran are safe to visit but you need a permit to enter any of the National Parks and it’s best to take a tour leader or a ranger with yourself to get close to any of the wild animals you like to see.
The complete national parks, protected areas, and wildlife refuges in Iran include:

National Parks
Bakhtegan National Park
Bamu National Park — near Shiraz
Bojagh National Park
Dayer-Nakhiloo National Park
Ghamishloo National Park
Ghatroyeh National Park
Golestan National Park
Kavir National Park
Khabr National Park - near Kerman
Khar Turan National Park
Kiasar National Park
Kolahghazi National Park
Lake of Ghosts - near Vanush
Lake Urmia National Park
Lar National Park
Naybandan Wildlife Refuge
Paband National Park
Salouk National Park
Sarigol National Park
Siyahkooh National Park
Sorkheh Hesar National Park
Tandooreh National Park
Tang-e Sayad National Park

Protected Areas
Alvand Protected Area
Arasbaran Protected Area
Arjan Protected Area
Bafq Protected Area
Baloot Boland Protected Area, near Daryas and Dehdez in Khuzestan along the Karun River
Bisotun Protected Area, north of Kermanshah
Central Alborz Protected Area
Dehdez Protected Area, near Ghaleh Sard (northwest of Dehdez) north of the Karun River
Dena Protected Area
Dinar Kouh Protected Area — Ilam Province
Haftad Goleh Protected Area, east of Arak, Iran
Hamoon Wetlands — Hamun-i-Helmand
Hara Protected Area
Haraz Protected Area
Heleh Protected Area, south of Berenjgan
Gando Protected Area
Geno Protected Area
Ghalajeh Protected Area
Kabir Kouh Protected Area — Ilam Province
Karkas Protected Area
Karkheh Protected Area
Kavir Protected Area
Koulak Protected Area — Ilam Province
Kuh-e-Dil Protected Area
Lake of Ghosts - near Vanush
Lar Protected Area
Manesht & Ghelarang Protected Area — Ilam Province
Mianjangal Protected Area
Miankaleh Protected Area
Mozaffari Protected Area
Oshtoran Mountain Protected Area (Oshtran Kuh Protected Area?)
Sheyvand Protected Area, near Sheyvand in Khuzestan southwest along the Karun River
Shaloo & Mongasht Protected Area, southwest along the Karun River
Shimbar and Lake Area of Karun Dam Protected Area
Siahkeshim Protected Area
Siahroud Roudbar Protected Area
Touran Protected Area
Nazhvan Suburban Natural Park — near Isfahan

Wildlife Refuges
Amirkalayeh Wildlife Refuge
Bakhtegan Wildlife Refuge
Dar-e Anjir Wildlife Refuge
Hamoon Wildlife Refuge
Miandasht Wildlife Refuge
Miankaleh Wildlife Refuge
Mouteh Wildlife Refuge
Naybandan Wildlife Refuge
Robat Shur Wildlife Refuge
Selkeh Wildlife Refuge
Shadegan Wildlife Refuge
Shidvar Wildlife Refuge
Sorkhankol Wildlife Refuge
Touran Wildlife Refuge
Shadegan Wildlife Area

National Natural Monuments
Alam-Kuh
Chenar-e Kamarbasteh
Mount Damavand
Sabalan
Sarv-e Abarkuh
Sarv-e Mehregan
Taftan Volcano

Natural World Heritage Sites
Caspian Hyrcanian mixed forests
Lut Desert

Natural National Heritage Sites
Ali-Sadr Cave
Alvand
Badab-e Surt
Bil spring
Bisheh Waterfall
Chenar-e Kamarbasteh
Chenar-e Khameneh
Chenar-e Sukhteh Sarakhs
Chenar-e Sukhteh Shahrud
Deymeh Headwater
Ghar Parau
Gamasiyab Cave
Gamasiyab Headwater
Ganjnameh Waterfall
Gerit Waterfall
Giyan Headwater
Golestan National Park
Headwater of Bisotun
Jashak salt dome
Karun
Mount Damavand
Nojian Waterfall
Ovan Lake
Piran waterfall
Quri Qala Cave
Rahmat tree
Sabalan
Sarv-e Abarkuh
Sarv-e Mehregan
Shaho
Valasht lake
Zayanderud
Zrebar Lake

Other
Cheshme Langan
Golestan Kuh
Poshtkue Forests
Sataple Hunting Prohibited Area

See also 
National Parks of Iran
Protected areas of Iran

References

External links

 List
 List
Iran
National parks
Parks in Iran
National parks and protected areas